Morrowites, named by Cobban and Hook, 1983, is a moderate to large-sized ammonite with quadrangular to depressed whorls, broadly rounded to depressed venter, low ribs, umbilical and inner and outer ventrolateral tubercles and smooth early whorls except for occasional ribs along weak constrictions. The suture is moderately simple and has an unusually broad bifid first lateral lobe. It is so far restricted to the Lower Turonian stage, in the mid Cretaceous.

Morrowites closely  resembles Mammites, however Morrowites has a broad first lateral lobe, Mammites has a narrow one. The very early whorls of Morrowites are smooth except for distantly placed ribs and constrictions, those of Mammites have normal ribs and tubercles.

Etymology 
Morrowites is named in honor of A. L. Morrow who made a pioneering study of Cenomanian and Turonian ammonites of Kansas.

Distribution 
Fossils of Morrowites have been found in Colombia (Loma Gorda Formation, Aipe, Huila), France, Germany, Mexico, Nigeria, and the United States (Arizona, New Mexico).

References

Bibliography

Further reading 
 W. A. Cobban and S. C. Hook, 1983. Mid-Cretaceous (Turonian) ammonite fauna from Fence Lake area of west-central New Mexico.  Memoir 41, New Mexico Bureau of Mines&Mineral Resources, Socorro NM

Ammonitida genera
Acanthoceratidae
Cretaceous ammonites
Ammonites of Africa
Cretaceous Africa
Ammonites of Europe
Cretaceous Europe
Cretaceous France
Ammonites of North America
Cretaceous Mexico
Cretaceous United States
Ammonites of South America
Cretaceous Colombia
Turonian life
Fossil taxa described in 1983